Artfuck: A Compilation of Rarities (1980–1983) is a compilation album by the Irish post-punk band Virgin Prunes. Released on New Rose Records in 1993, it marked the first time the "Twenty Tens" and "Moments and Mine" singles had been issued on CD.

Track listing

Personnel 

Virgin Prunes
 Mary D'Nellon – drums
 Dik Evans – guitar
 Gavin Friday – vocals
 Guggi – vocals
 Strongman – bass guitar

Technical personnel
 Virgin Prunes – production

Release history

References 

1993 compilation albums
Virgin Prunes albums